Elton Lewis Pollock (born April 17, 1973) is an American college baseball coach and former center fielder. Pollock is the head coach of the Presbyterian Blue Hose baseball team.

Amateur career
Pollock attended Irmo High School in Columbia, South Carolina. Pollock played for the school's varsity baseball and football teams as well. Pollock then enrolled at Presbyterian College, where he played baseball and football for the Presbyterian Blue Hose.

Pollock finished his career at Presbyterian with 34 home runs, a .616 slugging percentage, 11 triples, 169 runs scored and 382 total bases.

Professional career
Pollock was drafted in the 1995 Major League Baseball draft 405th overall by the Pittsburgh Pirates.

Pollock began his professional career with the Erie SeaWolves of the Class A Short Season New York–Penn League, where he batted .299 with two home runs. He was promoted to the Augusta GreenJackets of the Class A South Atlantic League in the summer of 1995. He hit .234 with five doubles for Augusta. Pollock started 1996 with the GreenJackets. He completed the season batting .235 with 5 home runs and 47 RBIs in 132 games. Pollock retired after the season.

Coaching career
Pollock began his coaching career as a full-time assistant at Presbyterian in 2002. Following the 2003 season, he moved to a volunteer assistant position while working at baseball training facility nearby. In the fall of 2004, Pollock was named the head coach of Presbyterian. He helped guide the team from Division II to Division I in 2008. In 2017, he guided the Blue Hose to their best season in their brief Division I history, finishing 32–29 and in 3rd placed in the Big South Conference.

Head coaching record

See also
 List of current NCAA Division I baseball coaches

References

External links

Presbyterian Blue Hose bio

Living people
1973 births
Baseball outfielders
Presbyterian Blue Hose football players
Presbyterian Blue Hose baseball players
Augusta GreenJackets players
Erie SeaWolves players
Presbyterian Blue Hose baseball coaches
Baseball players from South Carolina
Baseball coaches from South Carolina
African-American baseball coaches
African-American baseball players